Frontier High School may refer to:

Frontier Central High School (New York) — Hamburg, New York

Frontier High School (Bakersfield, California) — Bakersfield, California
Frontier High School (Camarillo, California) — Camarillo, California
Frontier High School (Whittier, California) — Whittier, California
Frontier High School (Elizabeth, Colorado) — Elizabeth, Colorado
Frontier High School (Fort Collins, Colorado) — Fort Collins, Colorado
Frontier High School (Ohio) — New Matamoras, Ohio
Frontier High School (Oklahoma) — Red Rock, Oklahoma
Frontier Regional School — South Deerfield, Massachusetts
Camden-Frontier High School — Camden, Michigan
Frontier Junior-Senior High School — Chalmers, Indiana